Zanthoxylum ekmanii is a species of plant in the family Rutaceae. It is found in Belize, Costa Rica, Guatemala, Honduras, Mexico, Nicaragua, and Panama.

References

ekmanii
Taxonomy articles created by Polbot
Taxobox binomials not recognized by IUCN